Delphine Saubaber (born 1978 in Agen) is a French journalist.

Career 

She performed her first internship at the Sud Ouest agency in Agen. She then worked for Le Monde, before joining the world service at L'Express as senior reporter.

In 2010, Saubader was awarded the Albert Londres Prize.

Works 
2011: 
2016:

References

External links 
 Le pays empoisonné on Eyrolles
 List of articles in L'Express
 Delphine Saubaber on Dailymotion

1978 births
People from Agen
Living people
Sciences Po alumni
21st-century French journalists
French women journalists
Albert Londres Prize recipients
21st-century French women